Nirnaya Shrestha,known professionally as  Nirnaya Da' NSK is a Nepalese rapper and songwriter. NSK that stands for ‘Naughty Soul Kid’ is not only famous for his hip hop and R&B music but is also famous for his involvement in social cause, most importantly providing education to the underprivileged children. He also participated Melancholy as a rapper, an environmental song by 365 Nepalese artists is written, music composed and directed by environmentalist Nipesh DHAKA. This song has been certified in Guinness World Record entitled "Most Vocal Solos in a Song Recording".

Some facts about Nirnaya
Nirnaya Shrestha was awarded 'Presidential Fitness Academic Award' by the then President of America George Bush when he was in class 8 in Mt Logan Middle School in United States of America. 
Nirnaya never thought of becoming a rapper but an aeronautical engineer instead.
Nirnaya was a very shy kid and never performed on stage but used to enjoy backstage pulling curtains up and down until class 4.
His first job was plucking up a bunch of grass for a week to earn $120 to buy a pair of Michael Jordan basketball shoes in US.

Awards and recognitions
Kalika FM award for the Best Hip Hop and Rap artist of the year 2005
Image Award Best Vocal Performance of the Year with National Feeling for the song ‘Ma Nepali’ in 2057 BS
Sixth Annual Image Award Best Vocal Performance of the year 2060 Rock and Others (together with his band)
Channel Nepal Music Video Awards – Best Rap Video of the Year for ‘Din Pani’
Third highest played band of the year by Kantipur FM
Academic Fitness Award received from President George Bush (Class 8, USA)

References 

21st-century Nepalese male singers
Living people
Year of birth missing (living people)
Nepali-language singers